The Prasannapada (Sanskrit: Clear words; Chinese: 淨明句論, Tibetan ཚིག་གསལ།) is a commentary on the Mūlamadhyamakakārikā of Nagarjuna by the 7th-century Indian Buddhist master, Chandrakirti.

Notes

References
 

Madhyamaka
Mahayana texts
Ancient Indian literature